Kamagong is a 1987 Philippine action drama film written and directed by Carlo J. Caparas. The film stars Lito Lapid, J.C. Bonnin and Ruel Vernal. The film involves the use of a martial arts sport called arnis.

The film is streaming online on YouTube.

Plot
Ariel (Bonnin) perfects his skills in arnis and his idol Manuel (Lapid) made him rediscover what it takes to be a man.

Cast
 Lito Lapid as Manuel
 J.C. Bonnin as Ariel Salgado
 Eddie Garcia as Mr. Guevarra
 Ruel Vernal as Lorenzo Montero
 Mia Pratts as Belen
 Bong Dimayacyac as Melissa
 Dencio Padilla as Dencio
 Jaime Fabregas as Cenon Beltran
 Beth Bautista as Tarsila
 Julio Diaz as Emilio Salgado
 Mario Escudero as Rufo
 Sabatini Fernandez  as Sutero
 Bomber Moran as Taber
 Ernie Zarate as Chavez

Animated adaptation
An anime-influenced animated adaptation of the film was announced in 2018. It will be produced by Sinag Animation Studios. The production was reportedly in the works in 2019, with the release of a trailer and an animated music video for its theme song "Ako'y Magwawagi". However, it experienced issues due to the COVID-19 pandemic. As of 2023, its status is currently unknown.

References

External links

Full Movie

1987 films
1987 action films
Filipino-language films
Philippine action films
Arnis films
Viva Films films
Films directed by Carlo J. Caparas